Mohamed Nbalie Kamara (born 29 May 1999) is a Sierra Leonean footballer who plays as a goalkeeper for Horoya AC and the Sierra Leone national team. He received attention for his performance against Algeria in Sierra Leone's opening 2021 Africa Cup of Nations match, being named Man of the Match after holding the defending champions to a 0–0 draw.

Club career
Mohamed Kamara started his career with Sierra Leonean side F.C. Johansen where he stayed for a season before joining East End Lions he spent three years at the club. On 22 May 2022, Guinean club Horoya AC announced they had signed him on a two-year contract lasting until 2024.

International career
He was called up to the 2021 Africa Cup of Nations as first choice goalkeeper where he shone in the teams opening game against defending champions Algeria where he kept a cleansheet and followed up with winning man of the match. Kamara made headlines worldwide due to his unorthodox goalkeeping style used in his man of the match performance. In the second game against Ivory Coast where he saved Franck Kessie penalty to secure a 2–2 draw. Sierra leone would go on to exit the groupstage after a loss to Equatorial Guinea.

References

1999 births
Living people
Sierra Leonean footballers
Sierra Leone international footballers
People from Kambia District
Association football goalkeepers
FC Johansen players
East End Lions F.C. players
2021 Africa Cup of Nations players